Lightning activity level (LAL) is a scale that describes degrees and types of lightning activity. Values are labeled 1–6.

References

Lightning
Electrical phenomena
Space plasmas
Weather hazards
Storm